Kenneth B. Knox (September 13, 1920 – February 24, 1970) was an American football and track coach and college athletics administrator. He served as the head football coach at Southeast Missouri State College—now known as Southeast Missouri State University—from 1952 to 1967, compiling a record of 88–59–4. Knox also coached track at Southeast Missouri State and was the school's athletic director until his death in early 1970.

Knox was born in Brazeau, Missouri and attended high school in Perryville, Missouri. He served in the United States Navy in the Pacific during World War II, reaching the rank of lieutenant commander before his discharge. Knox played college football at Southeast Missouri State, where was a member of the Emmett Stuber's undefeated 1946 team and graduated in 1948. He began his coaching career in 1948 at Sikeston High School in Sikeston, Missouri, where he led his football teams to a record of 35–0–3 in four seasons. He was hired as head coach in football and track at his alma mater, Southeast Missouri State, in 1952.

Knox died on February 24, 1970, at Southeast Missouri Hospital in Cape Girardeau, Missouri, following a long illness.

Head coaching record

College football

References

1920 births
1984 deaths
American football tackles
Southeast Missouri State Redhawks athletic directors
Southeast Missouri State Redhawks football coaches
Southeast Missouri State Redhawks football players
College track and field coaches in the United States
High school football coaches in Missouri
United States Navy personnel of World War II
United States Navy officers
People from Perryville, Missouri
Coaches of American football from Missouri
Players of American football from Missouri